Acmispon americanus, known by the common names American bird's-foot trefoil and Spanish clover, is a species of legume native to most habitats of California, the Western United States,  Western Canada, and northern Mexico.

Description
The plant is an upright hairy annual, growing to 25 cm. The flowers (to 6mm) are pale pink to cream.

Subspecies
Acmispon americanus is often discussed as comprising several varieties, including:
Acmispon americanus var. americanus

References

External links
CalFlora Database: Acmispon americanus
Jepson eFlora:  Acmispon americanus — TJM2 (2012)
Jepson Manual Treatment:  Lotus purshianus — JM93 (1993)

americanus
Flora of California
Flora of the Western United States
Flora of Northeastern Mexico
Flora of Northwestern Mexico
Flora of Western Canada
Flora of the California desert regions
Flora of the Rocky Mountains
Flora of the Sierra Nevada (United States)
Flora without expected TNC conservation status